Reality is a 1974  album by jazz bassist Monk Montgomery, one of his four solo albums. It was released by Philadelphia International Records.

Track listing
"Reality" – 5:39
"Me and Mrs. Jones" – 3:09
"Sippin' and Tippin'" – 4:54
"Bump de Bump" – 3:15
"I Love You Camille" – 5:20
"Little O's" – 5:56
"Girl Talk" – 5:06

Personnel
Monk Montgomery – bass
Danny Skea – piano and clavinet
Ron Feuer – organ
Santo Sazino – drums 
Earl Young – drums
Norman Harris – guitar
Bobby Martin – Fender Rhodes
Ron Kersey – piano & clavinet
Vincent Montana Jr. – vibes
Larry Washington – bongos & congas
Ronnie Baker – bass
Don Renaldo's Strings and Horns

References

1974 albums
Monk Montgomery albums
Albums produced by Bobby Martin
Albums arranged by Bobby Martin
Albums recorded at Sigma Sound Studios
Philadelphia International Records albums